Roman Holiday is a jukebox musical with music and lyrics by Cole Porter, and a book by Paul Blake. Based on the 1953 film of the same name, the musical tells the story of a young European princess and the American reporter who inadvertently aids in her escape from a whirlwind European tour, resulting in 24 hours spent in Italy's capital.

Productions 
Roman Holiday: the Cole Porter Musical debuted at The Muny in St. Louis, Missouri on July 9, 2001. There was a reading for the Guthrie Theatre 2012 production starring Laura Osnes and John Behlmann. A production of Roman Holiday opened the Guthrie Theatre in Minneapolis, Minnesota in 2012 from June 9 to August 19  After a substantial book rewrite and recruiting a new director, the revised production announced a pre-broadway run at the Golden Gate Theatre in San Francisco during May–June 2017, starring Stephanie Styles and Drew Gehling.

Musical numbers
Guthrie Theater

 Act I
 "Overture"
 "Once Upon a Time" – Princess
 "I'm Throwing a Ball Tonight" – Joe, Ensemble
 "Experiment" – Countess, Princess
 "Why Shouldn't I?" – Princess
 "Ace In the Hole" – Joe, Ensemble
 "Let's Be Buddies" – Joe, Princess
 "Look What I Found" – Joe, Princess, Ensemble
 "Wouldn't It Be Fun?" – Irving, Princess, Joe
 "Most Gentlemen Don't Like Love" – Francesca, Princess
 "Ridin' High" – Joe, Princess, Ensemble

 Act II
 "Entr'acte"
 "A Picture of Me Without You" – Joe, Princess, Irving
 "Use Your Imagination" – Princess, Joe
 "Just One of Those Things" – Francesca, Male Quartet
 "Easy to Love" – Joe
 "Ev'ry Time We Say Goodbye" – Princess, Joe
 "I Sleep Easier Now" – Countess 
 "Night and Day" – Joe
 "Experiment (Reprise)" – Princess

Golden Gate Theatre

 Act I
 "Why Shouldn't I" – Princess
 "You Do Something to Me" – Francesca and Ensemble
 "Take Me Back to Manhattan" – Joe, Irving and Ensemble
 "Let's Step Out" – Princess
 "Let's Step Out (Reprise)" – Princess
 "Experiment" – Joe
 "Experiment Ballet" – Princess, Joe and Ensemble
 "Look What I Found" – Joe, Princess and Ensemble
 "Night and Day" – Irving and Francesca
 "Look What I Found (Reprise)" – Princess, Joe and Irving
 "Ridin' High" – Joe, Princess and Ensemble
 "Why Shouldn't I (Reprise)" – Princess

 Act II
 "Most Gentlemen Don't Like Love" – Francesca and Ladies
 "Night and Day (Reprise)" – Irving
 "Use Your Imagination" – Princess and Joe
 "Begin the Beguine" – Francesca and Men
 "You Do Something to Me (Reprise)" – Irving and Francesca
 "Easy to Love" – Joe
 "Goodbye, Little Dream" – Princess
 "Just One of Those Things" – Princess and Joe
 "Experiment (Reprise)" – Princess

Characters and original cast

References

2001 musicals
Cole Porter
Jukebox musicals
Musicals based on films